Parimal Debbarma is a  Tipra Indian politician from Tripura.He is a leader of Bharatiya Janata Party of Ambassa committee. Since 2018, he has been the Member of the Legislative Assembly from Ambassa.

References

Indian politicians
Bharatiya Janata Party politicians
State legislatures of India
Year of birth missing (living people)
Living people